The 2014 Ulster Senior Club Football Championship was the 47th instalment of the annual competition organised by Ulster GAA. It is one of the four provincial competitions of the 2014–15 All-Ireland Senior Club Football Championship.

Derry's Ballinderry Shamrocks were the defending champions, but defeat to Slaughtneil in the county final meant they couldn't defend their title.

Slaughtneil went on to win their first Ulster title, beating Tyrone champions Omagh St Enda's in the final.

Teams
The Ulster championship is contested by the winners of the nine county championships in the Irish province of Ulster. Ulster comprises the six counties of Northern Ireland, as well as Cavan, Donegal and Monaghan in the Republic of Ireland.

Bracket

Preliminary round

Quarter-finals

Semi-finals

Final

Championship statistics

Top scorers
Overall

In a single game

References

Ulster Senior Club Football Championship
2014 in Northern Ireland sport
Ulster Senior Club Championship